"Shakin'" is a song written by Mark Miller and Randy Scruggs, and recorded by American country music group Sawyer Brown. It was released in May 1986 as the third single and title track from the album Shakin'.  The song reached number 15 on the Billboard Hot Country Singles & Tracks chart.

Music video
The music video was directed by Martin Kahan and premiered in mid-1986.

Chart performance

References

1986 singles
1985 songs
Sawyer Brown songs
Songs written by Mark Miller (musician)
Songs written by Randy Scruggs
Capitol Records Nashville singles
Curb Records singles
Songs about dancing